Mahjoubi Aherdane (born 1921/1924 in Oulmes and died on November 15, 2020) was a Moroccan politician, Amazigh nationalist, poet and painter. Alongside  Abdelkrim al-Khatib, he founded the Popular Movement in 1957, a political party defending the Amazigh cause and formed mainly of former militants of the Moroccan Liberation Army (ALN).

Independent Morocco 
During the Moroccan constitutional referendum of 1962, Aherdane voted in favor of the text of the first constitution of independent Morocco and led his party to join the Front for the Defense of Constitutional Institutions (FDIC) -a party created by Ahmed Réda Guédira, a close friend of King Hassan II- in the legislative elections of 1963. This election was won by a majority of the FDIC and led Aherdane to participate in the Bahnini government as Minister of National Defense from 1963 to 1964 and Minister of Agriculture from 1964 to 1965, a position he was to hold again in the Hassan II 4 government from 1965 to 1967.

In 1967, Abdelkrim al-Khatib decided to leave the Popular Movement to remain in the opposition and created the Popular Democratic and Constitutional Movement (MPDC, future PJD). In 1970, Aherdane left the Guédira movement (FDIC) and guided his party to second place in the 1970 legislative elections, which were won by independents who created the Rassemblement national des indépendants (RNI) a few years later.

In 1977, when the Osman II government was formed, Aherdane agreed to take part in it and became Minister of State in charge of posts and telecommunications, a position he would keep in the Bouabid I government. In 1981, he became Minister of State in charge of Cooperation in the Bouabid II government.

Works 

 Un poème pour étendard, L'Harmattan, 1991 (Novel)
 Ezzayegh, Éditions du Regard
 Mémoires, Éditions du Regard
 Aguns n tilla au cœur des ténèbres
 Iguider
 La masse ira
 Mémoires tome 2
 Le reflet du vent
 Ezzayegh
 Cela reste cela

References 

1921 births
2020 deaths
Moroccan politicians
Popular Movement (Morocco) politicians